The Chahamanas of Naddula, also known as the Chauhans of Nadol, were an Indian dynasty. They ruled the Marwar area around their capital Naddula (present-day Nadol in Rajasthan) between 10th and 12th centuries. They belonged to the Chahamana (Chauhan) clan of the Rajputs

The Chahamanas of Naddula were an offshoot of the Chahamanas of Shakambhari. Their founder, Lakshmana (alias Rao Lakha), was the son of the 10th century Shakambari ruler Vakpatiraja I. His brother Simharaja succeeded their father as the Shakambhari ruler. The subsequent rulers fought against the neighbouring kingdoms of the Paramaras of Malwa, the Chaulukyas, the Ghaznavids, as well as the Chahamanas of Shakambhari. The last ruler Jayata-simha was probably defeated by the Ghurid Empire general Qutb al-Din Aibak in 1197 CE.

History

Early rulers 

Lakshmana, the founder of the dynasty, was a son of the Shakambhari Chahamana king Vakpatiraja I. While his elder brother Simharaja succeeded Vakpatiraja, he carved out a principality at Naddula in the mid-10th century. According to the legendary text Lakhana Raula Prabandha, the Brahmanas of Naddula hired him to protect the town against freebooters called the Medas.

Lakshmana's son Shobhita defeated the ruler of Arbuda (modern Mount Abu), who probably belonged to a Paramara branch. Shobhita's son Baliraja fought against the Paramara king Munja, with both the sides claiming victory. Baliraja probably died heirless, and was succeeded by Lakshmana's younger son Vigrahapala.

Vigrahapala's son Mahindu helped the Hastikundi Rashtrakuta prince Dhavala against one Durlabharaja, who can be identified as the Shakambhari Chahamana king Durlabharaja. Mahindu was succeeded by his elder son Ashvapala, whose son and successor Ahila seems to have repulsed an invasion by the Chaulukya king Bhima I. Ahila, who probably died heirless, was succeeded by Mahindu's younger son Anahilla.

Expansion 

Anahilla (r. c. 1024-1055 CE) was among the dynasty's most successful rulers, and greatly expanded the kingdom. According to the Sundha Hill inscription, he defeated Bhima, captured Shakambhari, killed the Paramara king Bhoja's general Sadha, and defeated the Turushkas (Turkic people). Historian Dasharatha Sharma theorizes that the Bhoja occupied Shakambhari after defeating the Shakambhari Chahamana king Viryarama, and Anahilla helped Viryarama's successor Chamundaraja in evicting the Paramaras. On the other hand, R. B. Singh theorizes that Anahilla helped Bhoja against Viryarama, but their alliance broke, leading to a conflict between Anahilla and Bhoja's general Sadha. The Turushkas were probably a Ghaznavid force.

Anahilla was succeeded by his sons Balaprasada and Jendraraja one after another. Jendraraja appears to have defeated a Chaulukya ruler, either Bhima I or Bhima's successor Karna. Jendraraja's sons Prithvipala, Jojalladeva, and Asharaja succeeded him one after another. Prithvipala defeated Karna, probably in alliance with his other neighbours such as the Shakambhari Chahamana king Vigraharaja III and the Paramara king Udayaditya. He also seems to have defeated a Paramara chief of Vagada. He  Jojalladeva is said to have occupied the Chaulukya capital Anahillapura, possibly during a raid.

Dynastic feuds 

Asharaja was dethroned by Prithvipala's son Ratnapala around 1119 CE. As a result, he sought shelter from the Chaulukya king Jayasimha Siddharaja. As a Chaulukya vassal, he participated in Jayasimha's war against the Paramara king Naravarman. Meanwhile, Ratnapala was succeeded by his son Rayapala, who was dethroned by Asharaja's son Katukaraja around 1145 CE. Katukaraja was succeeded by Asharaja's younger son Alhanadeva, who served as a vassal to the Chaulukya king Kumarapala. For a brief period, Kumarapala replaced Alhanadeva with his own governor at Naddula, when the Chaulukyas were fighting a war against the Shakambhari Chahamana king Arnoraja. Later, he reinstated Alhanadeva as the ruler of Naddula. In the mid-12th century, Alhanadeva curbed some disturbances in Saurashtra on behalf of Kumarapala.

Alhanadeva was succeeded by his elder son Kelhanadeva, while his younger son Kirtipala established the Chahamana principality at Jalore.

Decline 

In 1178 CE, the Ghurids led by Muhammad of Ghor, invaded the Chaulukya kingdom and temporarily dislodged Kelhanadeva from Naddula. Kelhanadeva, his brother Kirtipala and other Chaulukya feudatories helped the Chaulukyas defeat the Ghurids at the Battle of Kasahrada in 1178 CE. As a result, Kelhana managed to regain control of Naddula. As a Chaulukya feudatory, Kelhanadeva also repulsed an invasion by the Yadava ruler Bhillama V.

By the time of Kelhanadeva's son Jayatasimha, the Ghurids had grown more powerful, having defeated the Shakambhari Chahamana king Prithviraja III. In 1197 CE, the Ghurid general Qutb al-Din Aibak invaded Naddula and surrounding regions. Jayatasimha abandoned Naddula, and probably joined a Hindu confederacy to oppose the Ghurids at Mount Abu. Qutb al-Din Aibak defeated this confederacy, and the Naddula kingdom disintegrated into several principalities in the subsequent days. Samantasimha, who is attested by five inscriptions dated 1199-1201 CE, might have been a successor of Jayatasimha.

Coinage 

Alexander Cunningham had two Horseman and bull type coins, he categorised those coins as "unknown Rajput coins". One coin he published had legend on the reverse as "Sri Kalhana or Kilahana". Scholar Prafulla Chandra Roy suggested that these coins belong to Chauhan dynasty of Nadol. Col James Tod also procured many Horseman and bull type coins from Nadol.

List of rulers 

Following is a list of Chahmana rulers of Naddula, with approximate period of reign, as estimated by R. B. Singh:

References

Bibliography 

 
 
 
 
 

 
Dynasties of India
History of Rajasthan
Dynasties of the Rajputs
10th-century establishments in India
11th-century disestablishments in India
Rajput rulers
Agnivansha